Gjálp (or Gialp) and Greipa (or Greip) are two jötnar in Norse mythology, and the daughters of the giant Geirröðr. They are killed by the thunder-god Thor.

Names 
The Old Norse name Gjálp has been variously translated as 'screamer', 'yelper'. It is related to the Icelandic gjálp ('roar; sea, wave'), and to the Old Norse gjalpa ('to brag').

Greipa is translated as ('gripper, grasper'). It derives from the Old Norse greip ('hand [with spread thumbs], handle').

Attestations

Prose Edda 

In Skáldskaparmál (The Language of Poetry), Thor meets Gjálp as he is trying to wade across the Vimur River; she is causing the river to swell with what appears to be her urine or menstrual fluids as she is standing "astride the river".

Thor eventually reaches Geirrödargardar, the abode of the giant Geirröðr. He sits on a chair that is lifted up against the roof by Gjálp and Greipa as they are trying to kill him.

Viking Age 
The same myth is told in Þórsdrápa by Eilífr Goðrúnarson (late 10th c. AD), which is cited by Snorri Sturluson in Skáldskaparmál, although the giantesses are not named in the poem.

Gesta Danorum 
Gesta Danorum (Deeds of the Danes) relates a similar story as Thorkillus (Thokil) and his companions are visiting the hall of the dead Geruthus (Geirröðr) when they notice the pierced body of an old man and three dead women with their backs broken. Thokil tells them that the god Thor "has driven a burning ingot though the vitals of Geirrœth" and that the "women have been struck by the force of Thor’s thunderbolt and have paid the penalty for attacking his divinity by having their bodies broken".

Other texts 
In Völuspá hin skamma (37), Gjálp and Greipa are listed among the Nine Mothers of Heimdallr. Gjálp is also mentioned in the þulur and in kennings of skaldic poetry. Greipa on her side is not mentioned in Nafnaþulur and found only once in the skaldic kenning.

In Haustlöng, Þjazi is called "the son of the suitor of Greipa". Greipa may be used there as a generic giantess name and the kenning may mean simply "giant".

In a lausavísa composed by Vetrliði Sumarliðason and quoted in Skáldskaparmál, Gjálp is mentioned as being killed by Thor.

References

Bibliography

Further reading 

Brodeur's translation of the Prose Edda
Lausavísa by Vetrliði Sumarliðason

Gýgjar
Mythological duos
Sister duos